Hooper & Co. was a British coachbuilding business for many years based in Westminster London. From 1805 to 1959 it was a notably successful maker, to special order, of luxury carriages, both horse-drawn and motor-powered.

Founding
The company was founded as Adams and Hooper in 1805 and held a royal warrant from 1830, building elegant horse-drawn carriages, supplying them to King William IV, Queen Victoria and King Edward VII. They moved into motor bodies at the turn of the 20th century.
The first royal car, a Hooper body on a Daimler chassis, was delivered to Sandringham on 28 March 1900. It was painted chocolate brown with red lines; a livery which continued for the royal family well into the twentieth century.

Market
Hooper specialized in the very top tier of the market, building the most luxurious bodies possible without consideration of cost.  The models were not sporty, as the company specialized in stately, elegant carriages. Coach customers included the Marquis of Londonderry and the Marquis of Crewe . Car body customers included the Kings of Spain, Norway, Portugal and Siam, the Shah of Persia and the Negus of Abyssinia.  In 1911, Hooper built an extension onto their Kings Road works, due to increased customer demand. Their London showroom, opened 1896 (possibly earlier), was on the corner of St James' Street and Bennet Street.  It included a vehicle lift so that coaches and cars could be displayed at first floor.  The alterations are likely to have been overseen by Francis Hooper, architect, son of the then owner.

Aircraft
During World War I, Hooper turned to aircraft manufacture, eventually producing Sopwith Camels at the rate of three a day. With peace, the firm returned to coachbuilding. They weathered the Great Depression of the 1930s far better than most coachbuilders, even building a second factory in Acton, West London. In the peak year of 1936, more than 300 bodies were built.

With re-armament in the late 1930s, another factory was opened in Park Royal, London, on Western Avenue, next to the Callard & Bowser confectionery works, and during World War II, they built fuselage sections for De Havilland Mosquito bombers, Airspeed Oxfords and gliders.

Expansion
In 1938 Hooper acquired rivals Barker who were in receivership. Barker retained its separate identity.

Hooper was acquired by The Daimler Company in 1940, becoming part of the BSA industrial group.

Lady Docker's cars
Post war, Hooper became famous for making a series of outrageously bodied large Daimlers for Lady Docker, the wife of the BSA chairman. This season's extravagant new Docker Daimler was exhibited each October at the London Motor Show. 
Docker Daimlers
 1951 Stardust or The Golden Daimler, limousine
 1952 Blue Clover, 5 seater saloon
 1953 Silver Flash, 2 seater fixed head coupé
 1954 Star Dust, limousine
 1955 Golden Zebra, 2 door, 4 seater fixed head coupé

Alloy structure
As the era of building cars on separate chassis was ending, and with it the market for complete bodies, Hooper completed the transition from wood-framed bodywork to bodies built over a skeleton of cast or extruded aluminium. Cast alloy was first used about 1933 in door and windscreen pillars where the 'fight' between roof and scuttle structures tended to cause cracking.

150th anniversary
"Hoopers the coachbuilders, whose Rolls-Royce seven-seater limousine, at £9,185, is the most expensive car at the Motor Show ("We're not ashamed of it; it's a magnificent example of a chauffeur-driven car. Even the hinged rear quarter-windows are electrically operated — most unusual"), are celebrating their 150th anniversary in a dignified way. The atmosphere in their St James's street showrooms is halfway between that of a fine tailor's and the waiting-room of a distinguished physician.

The quiet, unruffled representatives of the firm (now in the B.S.A. group) at the Hooper stand at Earls Court give a reassuring impression of solid continuity. All their car bodies are still handmade. "After a car is sold we're still very interested in it. King Feisal II—that was a Silver Cloud wasn't it? The Crown Prince of Iraq, he had a Bentley. The Shah of Persia, a Rolls-Royce. The King of Afghanistan, he had an open tourer Daimler." The roof of a car for The Ameer of Bahawalpur was entirely of Perspex. There was also the Dockers' famous golden car — a wonderful piece of craftsmanship."

End of production
Rolls-Royce, and their subsidiary, Bentley, became the main supplier of rolling chassis for the coachbuilding trade. Hooper's management decided to end production of coachbuilt bodies after Rolls-Royce's plans to cease series production of separate-chassis cars and use unibody construction exclusively became known to them in 1958. Their showroom at St. James's Street closed down at the end of September that year. Production at Daimler, Hooper's in-group chassis supplier, fell to 110 Daimler SP250 sports cars in 1959, with no saloons or limousines being built that year. 

Hooper exhibited their coachbuilt cars for the last time at the 1959 Earls Court Motor Show. Four cars were on the stand: a close-coupled saloon based on a SP250 chassis, two Rolls-Royces, and a Bentley S2.  In addition to being the only Hooper-bodied S2, and being built on BC1AR, the first S2 Continental chassis, the Bentley had the last bespoke body Hooper built, number 10294. It was finished in October 1959.

At the end of 1959, BSA transferred the remaining business to a new entity, Hooper (Motor Services) Ltd, which acted as a sales and service company. In 1970 the company became a Rolls-Royce distributor.

Revival
In 1988 used Rolls-Royces and special rates for servicing them were offered by "authorised Rolls-Royce and Bentley dealers" Hooper & Co (Coachbuilders) Limited of Clabon Works, Kimberley Road, London NW 7SH and in addition they offered these special coachbuilt motor cars:
 Rolls-Royce Silver Spirit two-door (Genève 1985)
 Bentley Turbo R two-door (Genève 1986)
 Empress II (Genève 1988)
 Emperor state limousine (Genève 1990)
A brief news item at the end of 1990 reported they would restore classic cars but the advertising did not continue.

Gallery

Archives
 Science Museum, South Kensington, London - Hooper (Coachbuilders) & Co. Ltd. – original design drawings and motor car construction records c1910-59
 Denver Public Library - items from Hooper and Company records, 1947-1979 - received from Rippey's Veteran Car Museum (Denver, Colo.) including the collection of Osmond Rivers, Hooper designer 1930s to 1950s and Managing Director

Notes
Footnotes

Citations

References

External links

Hooper and its subsidiary Barker at the Rolls-Royce Enthusiasts Club, including carriage illustrations from Hooper records
Hooper advertisement July 1952
Hooper bodies on display in New York, April 1950
 Nubar Gulbenkian's 1947 Rolls-Royce

Hooper
Vehicle manufacture in London
Manufacturing companies established in 1805
Manufacturing companies disestablished in 1959
1805 establishments in England
British companies established in 1805
1959 disestablishments in England